State Planning Commission may refer to:
 Gosplan, ministry of Soviet Union
  (1952–1998), preceding the National Development and Reform Commission of the People's Republic of China
 State Planning Commission of North Korea, a cabinet-level organization within the North Korean government
 State Planning Commission (GDR), a central state authority of the GDR Council of Ministers for planning, coordinating and proportional development of all sectors of the economy

See also 
 National Planning Commission (disambiguation)